Statistics of the LFF Lyga for the 1933 season.

Overview
It was contested by 7 teams, and Kovas Kaunas won the championship.

League standings

References
RSSSF

LFF Lyga seasons
Lith
Lith
1